Jane Griffiths may refer to:
Jane Griffiths (actress) (1929–1975), British actress
Jane Griffiths (poet) (born 1970), British poet
Jane Griffiths (politician) (born 1954), British Labour party MP 1997–2005